Garmosht (also known as Jarmosht) is a village in Baghan Rural District, Mahmeleh District, Khonj County, Fars Province, Iran. At the 2006 census, its population was 290, in 62 families.

References 

Populated places in Khonj County